The Bilbrough Falls, also known as the Goomoolahra Falls, is a cascade waterfall that is located within the Springbrook National Park in the South East region of Queensland, Australia.

Location and features
The falls are located in the Gold Coast hinterland district, near Springbrook.

At the base of the waterfall the moist conditions have created a good habitat for the giant spear lily.

See also

 List of waterfalls of Queensland

References

External links
 
 

Waterfalls of Queensland
Geography of Gold Coast, Queensland
Cascade waterfalls
Springbrook, Queensland